"Here's to the Night" is a song by American alternative rock band Eve 6. It was released by RCA Records on March 6, 2001, as the second single from the band's second album, Horrorscope (2000). It peaked at number 30 on the US Billboard Hot 100 on July 28, 2001. "Here's to the Night" is, along with "Inside Out", one of the band's best-known songs and is known to be played at high school graduations and senior proms.

Composition
According to the sheet music published at Musicnotes.com by Alfred Publishing, the song is written in the key of G major and is set in time signature of common time with a tempo of 100 beats per minute. Collins's vocal range spans one octave, from D4 to D5.

Track listing
 Australian CD single
 "Here's to the Night"  – 4:09
 "Inside Out"  – 3:39
 "Tongue Tied"  – 3:10
 "Waterfalls"  – 3:18

Credits and personnel
Credits and personnel adapted from "Here's to the Night" Australian CD single liner notes.
 Eve 6 – writing
 Max Collins – writing
 Don Gilmore – production, engineering
 John Ewing Jr. – additional engineering, editing
 Tom Lord-Alge – mixing

Charts

Weekly charts

Year-end charts

Release history

References

2000 songs
2001 singles
Eve 6 songs
Music videos directed by Marcos Siega
RCA Records singles
Songs written by Max Collins (musician)